Hwang Ki-wook (born 10 June 1996) is a South Korean football defensive midfielder who plays for FC Anyang.

Club career 
Hwang joined FC Seoul in 2017. On 2 April 2017, he made his K League Classic debut against Jeonbuk Hyundai Motors.

In 2020, he was traded with Han Chan-hee and joined Jeonnam Dragons of K League 2.

In 2022, Ki-wook joined FC Anyang.

References

External links
 
 Hwang Ki-wook – National Team stats at KFA 

1996 births
Living people
Association football midfielders
South Korean footballers
South Korea under-17 international footballers
South Korea under-20 international footballers
South Korea under-23 international footballers
FC Seoul players
A.F.C. Tubize players
Jeonnam Dragons players
FC Anyang players
K League 1 players
K League 2 players
South Korean expatriate footballers
South Korean expatriate sportspeople in Belgium
Expatriate footballers in Belgium